= Veterans of Foreign Wars Memorial Plaza =

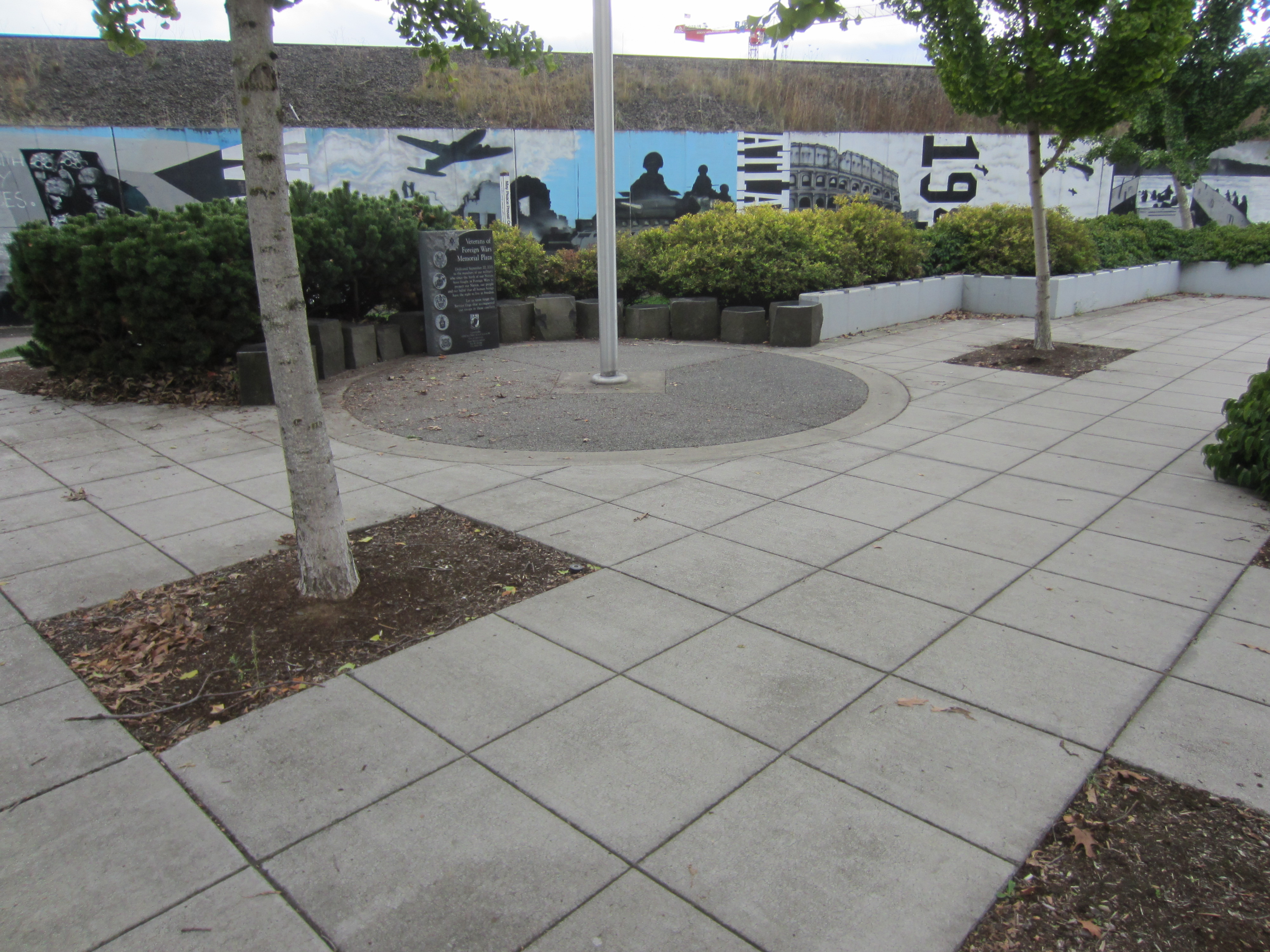
- The plaza in 2020

- Location within Washington (state)
- Location: Vancouver, Washington, U.S.
- Coordinates: 45°37′25″N 122°40′27″W
- Created: 2013

The Veterans of Foreign Wars Memorial Plaza is a plaza in Vancouver, Washington, United States. The plaza was created in 2013, and continues to be maintained by Veterans of Foreign Wars, Post 7824. It features a "Remembrance Wall" with murals by the Clark County Mural Society.

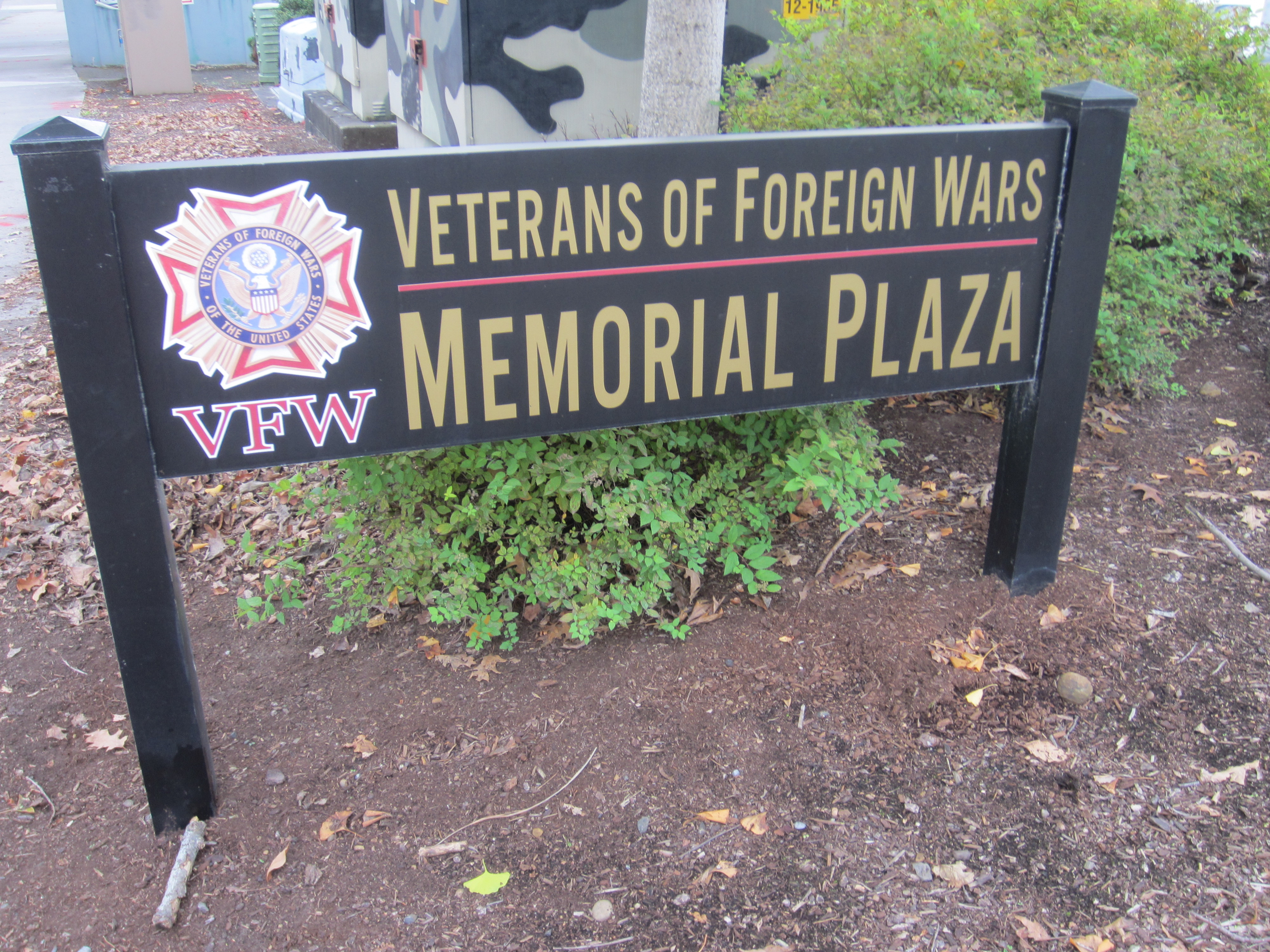

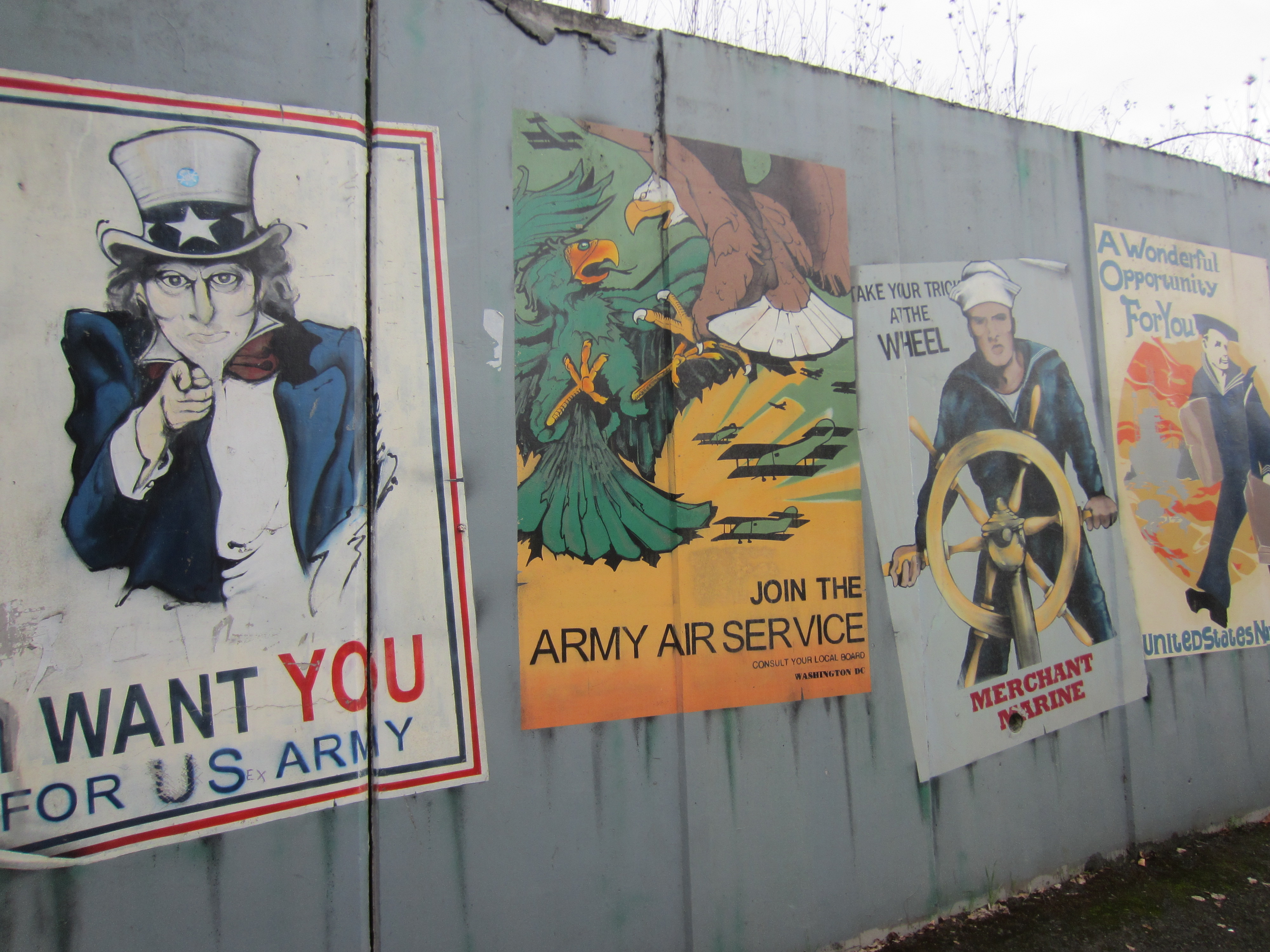

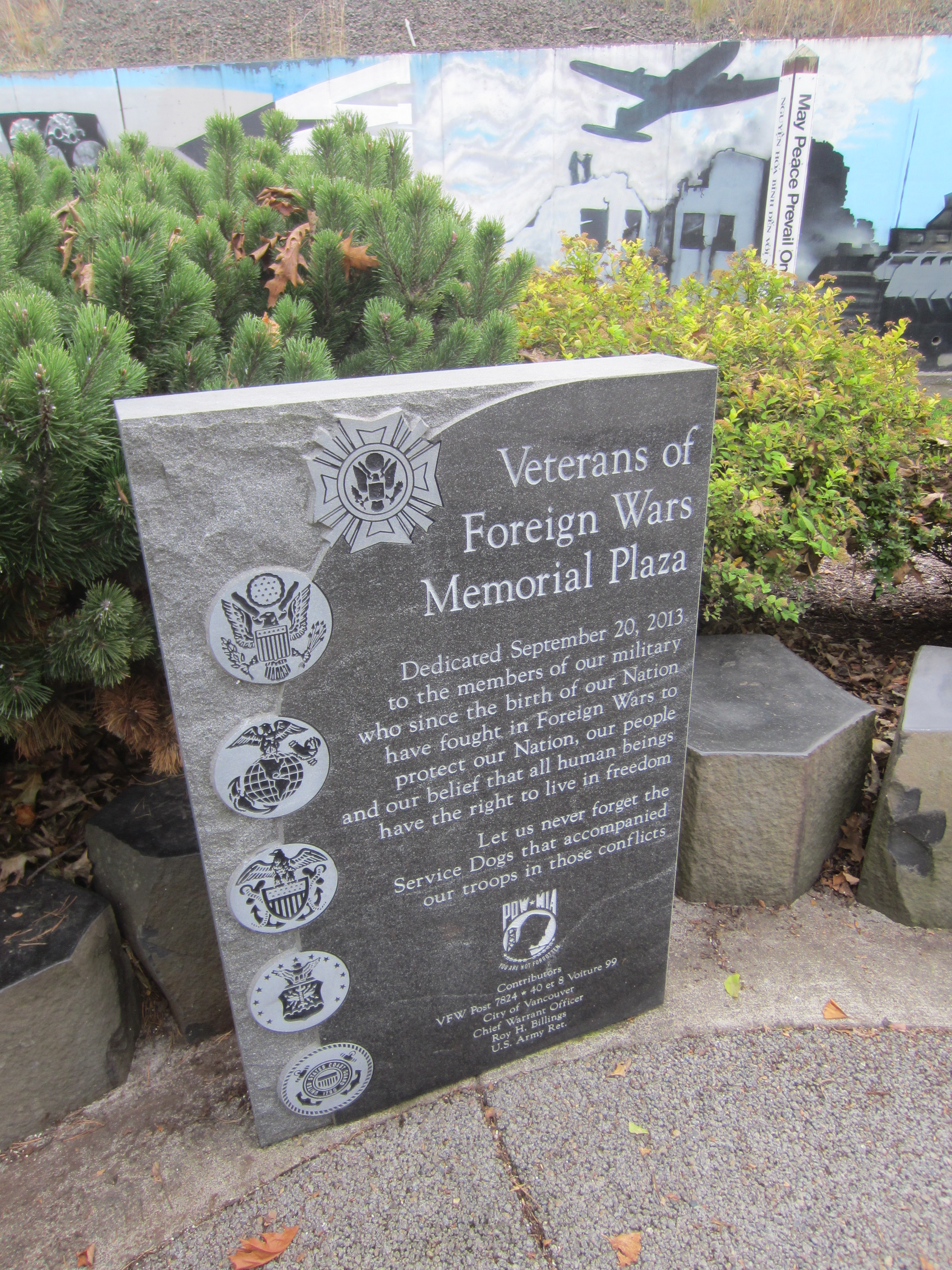

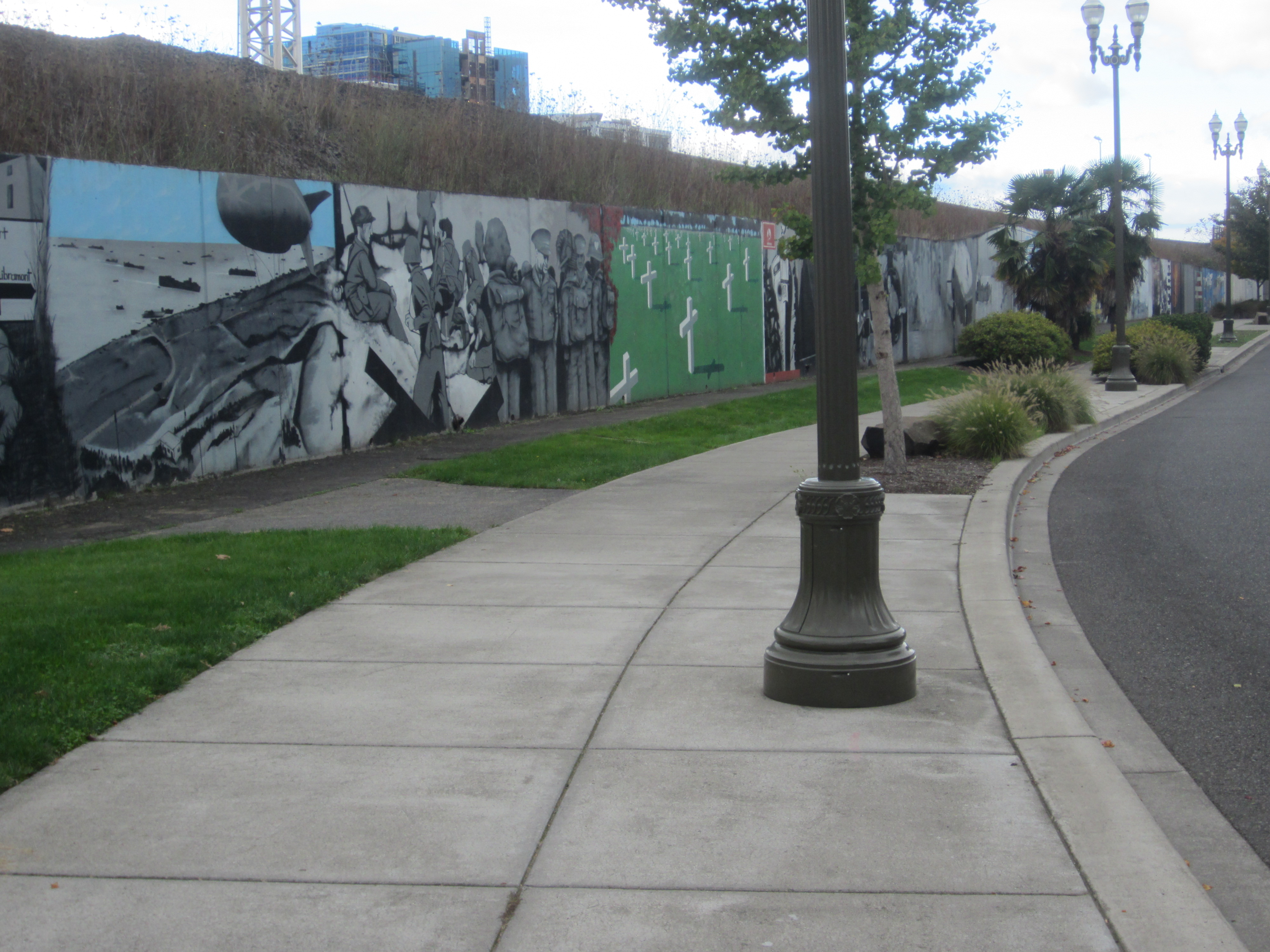
